The Plutonic Gold Mine is a gold mine located 82 km east-northeast of Peak Hill, Western Australia.

It is owned and operated by Canadian miner Superior Gold Inc. and located in the Plutonic Well Greenstone Belt. 5.5 million ounces of gold have been produced from both open pit and underground operations at Plutonic since it opened in 1990.

History

In 1988, Great Central Mines discovered the deposit which was to become Plutonic, which it sold for A$50 million in 1989, to Plutonic Resources, then a major Australian gold mining and exploration company, who commenced production in 1990. Homestake Mining Company purchased Plutonic in April 1998 for more than $1.0 billion, and, in turn, Homestake was acquired by Barrick Gold at the end of 2001.

The mine was acquired by Superior Gold from Northern Star Resources in September 2016 who acquired it from Barrick Gold in February 2014.

Production
Annual production figures for the Plutonic mine:

AISC = All-in sustaining cost

References

Bibliography

External links 
 
 MINEDEX website: Plutonic Gold Database of the Department of Mines, Industry Regulation and Safety
 Video of a fly by of the Plutonic Gold mine

Gold mines in Western Australia
Surface mines in Australia
Underground mines in Australia
Shire of Meekatharra
Barrick Gold